David Brian Stronach   (10 June 1931 – 27 June 2020) was a British archaeologist of ancient Iran and Iraq who became an expert on the city of Pasargadae and an emeritus professor at the University of California, Berkeley.

Born in June 1931, Stronach was the son of Ian David Stronach FRCSE and his wife Marjorie Jessie Duncan Minto, and was educated at Gordonstoun School and St John's College, Cambridge, from which he graduated Master of Arts in 1958.
In the 1960s and 1970s he was director of the British Institute of Persian Studies in Tehran. In the 1990s, he excavated several parts of Nineveh. His scholarship earned him several honours and awards, including the invitation to deliver endowed lectures at Harvard and Columbia.

During his time in Iran, he met Ruth Vaadia (1937–2017), an Israeli archaeologist who was also working in Iran, and married her in 1966. They have two daughters, Keren and Tami. The family left at the time of the 1979 Iranian Revolution. He became Professor of Near Eastern Studies in the Graduate Division, University of California, Berkeley, in 1981 and retired in 2004. Stronach's daughter Tami played the role of "The Childlike Empress" in the 1984 film The NeverEnding Story.

He died on 27 June 2020.

Honours
Officer of the Order of the British Empire, 1975
Fellow of the Society of Antiquaries of London
Archaeological Institute of America  Gold Medal for "Distinguished Archaeological Achievement", 2004

References

External links
Faculty website (archived)

1931 births
2020 deaths
20th-century archaeologists
21st-century archaeologists
Scottish archaeologists
Iranologists
British expatriates in Iran
University of California, Berkeley faculty
People educated at Gordonstoun
Alumni of St John's College, Cambridge
Officers of the Order of the British Empire